Zbenice is a municipality and village in Příbram District in the Central Bohemian Region of the Czech Republic. It has about 100 inhabitants.

Notable people
Alois Josef, Freiherr von Schrenk (1802–1849), Roman Catholic archbishop of Prague (1838–1849)

References

Villages in Příbram District